is the nineteenth single by Japanese artist Masaharu Fukuyama. It was released on December 1, 2004.

Track listing
"Naitari Shinaide"
"Red x Blue"
"Naitari Shinaide" (original karaoke)
"Red x Blue" (original karoke)

Oricon sales chart (Japan)

References

2004 singles
Masaharu Fukuyama songs
Oricon Weekly number-one singles
Japanese television drama theme songs